Tit is a Romanian male given name that may refer to:
 Tit Bud (1846–1917), priest, author, folklorist, translator, historian, aristocrat, and vicar
 Tit Liviu Chinezu (1904–1955), Romanian bishop
  (1886–1971), monk
 Tit Linda Sou (born 1989), female track and field sprint athlete
 Tit Štante (born 1998), Slovenian snowboarder
  (born 1938), Slovene diplomat and politician

Romanian masculine given names